Teri Louisa Keane (October 24, 1925 – November 17, 2022) was an American actress known for her work in the era of old-time radio. She was reported to have "appeared in more than 100 dramatic roles in radio and television." For a twelve-year period, from Oct 1963 to April 4, 1975, she played Martha Spears Marceau, the wife of police chief Bill Marceau on the CBS-TV daytime drama The Edge of Night.

Early years

Keane was born in Manhattan. Her father was a newspaperman, at one time an editor of The New York Globe, and her mother was "the leading coloratura" at the Hungarian Royal Opera House in Budapest, who later became a professor of music at Wittenberg College. She attended the Professional Children's School in Manhattan.

Keane's acting career began when she was 9 years old. "By the time I was 19," she told a reporter for a story in the November 1954 issue of TV-Radio Mirror, "I had played dramatic roles in five Broadway shows and was already a radio veteran."

Radio
Keane's roles on radio programs included those shown in the table below.

Keane was also a member of the casts of Mr. Mercury, Just Plain Bill,, and Somerset Maugham Theater. In the 1970s, she was heard on CBS Radio Mystery Theater.

Stage
Keane's Broadway credits include Hairpin Harmony, The Vagabond King, Swing Your Lady, and What a Life.

Television

Keane's roles on television programs included those shown in the table below.

Keane also appeared on Young Doctor Malone (1963), Kitty Foyle (1958), The Inner Flame (1955), The Road of Life (1954), All My Children (1979), Ryan’s Hope (1985), Guiding Light (1957, 1988), Search for Tomorrow (1956, 1980), As the World Turns (1961-1963), and American Inventory.

Personal life and death
Keane married radio and television actor John Larkin on June 10, 1950, in Englewood, New Jersey. They had a daughter, Sharon, born March 5, 1951. 

Keane died on November 17, 2022, at the age of 97.

References

External links
 

1925 births
2022 deaths
20th-century American actresses
21st-century American women
Actresses from New York City
American radio actresses
American soap opera actresses